Lake Abant is a freshwater lake in Turkey's Bolu Province in northwest Anatolia, formed as a result of a great landslide. It is a vacation and excursion spot for both Turkish and foreign travellers due to the natural environment, forests, and accessibility by car. It is served by a  road leaving from the İstanbul-Ankara motorway   or the highway  at the level of Mount Bolu, three hours' drive from these two largest cities in Turkey). Lake Abant is a natural park.

The lake area has two large hotels in the immediate vicinity of the shores, as well as other amenities and services for visitors, who sometimes alternatively opt for the family guesthouses available in the nearby town of Mudurnu, 18 km to the south.

European black pine, Scots pine, oaks, ashes, hornbeams, willows, junipers, tamarisks, hazels, common medlar, and strawberry trees are among the tree species that make up the lake's woodlands, and there are wild boars, fallow deer, roe deer, red deer, brown bears, wolves, red foxes, jackals, and rabbits in the surrounding forests, which makes the lake a prized location for hunters during the season. The lake is inhabited by the Abant trout Salmo abanticus, a (sub)species of trout which is strictly endemic to this lake only.

Gallery

References 

Abant
Landforms of Bolu Province
Nature parks in Turkey
Tourist attractions in Bolu Province
Abant Nature Park